Michael Joseph King (May 13, 1925 – December 10, 2018) was a Canadian football player who played for the Edmonton Eskimos and Toronto Argonauts. He won the Grey Cup with the Eskimos in 1954, 1955 and 1956. He was born in Toronto and died in Edmonton at the age of 93 from pneumonia in 2018.

References

1925 births
2018 deaths
Edmonton Elks players
Players of Canadian football from Ontario
Canadian football people from Toronto
Toronto Argonauts players